Gerald Nobles (born January 4, 1971 in Philadelphia, Pennsylvania), is an American boxer.

Professional career

This Philadelphia fighter turned pro on October 6, 1995, with a first round TKO of Juan Carlos Antonio.  His first nine wins were via knockout as well as fourteen of his first fifteen.

In 2001, Nobles won a Unanimous 10 round decision against heavyweight Sedreck Fields.  Two fights after that he took an eight round unanimous decision from Ron Guerrero in front of his hometown.

From there Nobles' biggest fight was against former World Heavyweight Champion Bruce Seldon.  The fight was stopped in the ninth round with Gerald scoring a TKO victory over the former world champ after Seldon was thumbed in the eye.  Seldon was winning the fight after 8 rounds on 2 of the scorecards.

Nobles' only loss occurred on November 20, 2004 to current World Boxing Association heavyweight champion Nikolay Valuev.  Nobles was disqualified in the fourth round for repeated low blows on Valuev. Nobles' team claims that Valuev wore his trunks high and that the referee disqualified Nobles unfairly.

Nobles has one fight since then and won a first round TKO (2:58) over Wallace McDaniel.

Professional boxing record

|-
|align="center" colspan=8|26 Wins (21 knockouts, 5 decisions), 1 Loss (0 knockouts, 1 decision)
|-
| align="center" style="border-style: none none solid solid; background: #e3e3e3"|Result
| align="center" style="border-style: none none solid solid; background: #e3e3e3"|Record
| align="center" style="border-style: none none solid solid; background: #e3e3e3"|Opponent
| align="center" style="border-style: none none solid solid; background: #e3e3e3"|Type
| align="center" style="border-style: none none solid solid; background: #e3e3e3"|Round
| align="center" style="border-style: none none solid solid; background: #e3e3e3"|Date
| align="center" style="border-style: none none solid solid; background: #e3e3e3"|Location
| align="center" style="border-style: none none solid solid; background: #e3e3e3"|Notes
|-align=center
|Win
|
|align=left| Andy Sample
|TKO
|1
|12/01/2007
|align=left| Tampa, Florida, United States
|align=left|
|-
|Win
|
|align=left| Wallace McDaniel
|TKO
|1
|26/10/2006
|align=left| North Charleston, South Carolina, United States
|align=left|
|-
|Loss
|
|align=left| Nikolai Valuev
|DQ
|4
|20/11/2004
|align=left| Kempten, Bayern, Germany
|align=left|
|-
|Win
|
|align=left| Curtis Taylor
|TKO
|1
|30/09/2004
|align=left| North Charleston, South Carolina, United States
|align=left|
|-
|Win
|
|align=left| Bruce Seldon
|TKO
|9
|15/05/2004
|align=left| Las Vegas, Nevada, United States
|align=left|
|-
|Win
|
|align=left| Willie Williams
|KO
|1
|17/04/2004
|align=left| New York City, United States
|align=left|
|-
|Win
|
|align=left| Ron Guerrero
|UD
|8
|20/06/2003
|align=left| Philadelphia, Pennsylvania, United States
|align=left|
|-
|Win
|
|align=left| Dennis McKinney
|TKO
|2
|26/09/2002
|align=left| North Charleston, South Carolina, United States
|align=left|
|-
|Win
|
|align=left| Sedreck Fields
|UD
|10
|24/01/2001
|align=left| Las Vegas, Nevada, United States
|align=left|
|-
|Win
|
|align=left| Caseny Truesdale
|TKO
|2
|14/12/2000
|align=left| Philadelphia, Pennsylvania, United States
|align=left|
|-
|Win
|
|align=left| Agustin Corpus
|UD
|8
|07/10/2000
|align=left| Uncasville, Connecticut, United States
|align=left|
|-
|Win
|
|align=left| John Kiser
|UD
|8
|30/01/1999
|align=left| Atlantic City, New Jersey, United States
|align=left|
|-
|Win
|
|align=left| Mitchell Rose
|TKO
|3
|12/12/1998
|align=left| Atlantic City, New Jersey, United States
|align=left|
|-
|Win
|
|align=left| Greg Pickrom
|TKO
|5
|04/12/1997
|align=left| Albany, New York, United States
|align=left|
|-
|Win
|
|align=left| Samson Cohen
|TKO
|1
|17/10/1997
|align=left| Philadelphia, Pennsylvania, United States
|align=left|
|-
|Win
|
|align=left| Rick Sullivan
|TKO
|3
|12/09/1997
|align=left| Philadelphia, Pennsylvania, United States
|align=left|
|-
|Win
|
|align=left| Exum Speight
|TKO
|3
|11/04/1997
|align=left| Philadelphia, Pennsylvania, United States
|align=left|
|-
|Win
|
|align=left| Ron McCarthy
|UD
|6
|22/02/1997
|align=left| Atlantic City, New Jersey, United States
|align=left|
|-
|Win
|
|align=left| Lou Turchiarelli
|TKO
|1
|07/01/1997
|align=left| Philadelphia, Pennsylvania, United States
|align=left|
|-
|Win
|
|align=left| Earl Clark
|TKO
|3
|06/12/1996
|align=left| Philadelphia, Pennsylvania, United States
|align=left|
|-
|Win
|
|align=left| Dennis Cain
|TKO
|3
|06/09/1996
|align=left| Philadelphia, Pennsylvania, United States
|align=left|
|-
|Win
|
|align=left| Maurice Harris
|KO
|3
|30/07/1996
|align=left| Philadelphia, Pennsylvania, United States
|align=left|
|-
|Win
|
|align=left| Mike Robinson
|TKO
|2
|19/04/1996
|align=left| Philadelphia, Pennsylvania, United States
|align=left|
|-
|Win
|
|align=left| Antoine McMullen
|KO
|1
|01/03/1996
|align=left| Philadelphia, Pennsylvania, United States
|align=left|
|-
|Win
|
|align=left| Keith Kiblin
|TKO
|1
|19/01/1996
|align=left| Philadelphia, Pennsylvania, United States
|align=left|
|-
|Win
|
|align=left| Ben Feliciano
|TKO
|1
|25/10/1995
|align=left| Boston, Massachusetts, United States
|align=left|
|-
|Win
|
|align=left| Juan Carlos Antonio
|TKO
|1
|06/10/1995
|align=left| Philadelphia, Pennsylvania, United States
|align=left|
|}

References

External links

Boxers from Pennsylvania
1971 births
Living people
American male boxers